Tarkwa Senior High School is a co-educational senior high school in the mining town of Tarkwa in the Western Region of Ghana.

History
The school was founded in 1961 by the first president of Ghana, Dr. Kwame Nkrumah, under the accelerated Development Plan for Education when Ghana attained independence.

Houses
The school has a total of 8 houses ( 4 for boys and 4 for girls).

Notable alumni
 Kwesi Amoako Atta - Ghanaian lawyer and politician
 Liquenda Daniel Allotey

Courses
General Science 
General Arts 
Business
Visual Arts
Home Economics
Agricultural Science

See also

 Education in Ghana
 List of senior high schools in Ghana

References

1961 establishments in Ghana
Educational institutions established in 1961
High schools in Ghana
Public schools in Ghana
Education in the Western Region (Ghana)